Gitte Spee (born December 29, 1950, Surabaya), is a Dutch illustrator of children's books. She studied at the Gerrit Rietveld Academie, a renowned academy of fine art and design in the Netherlands, and currently works in Amsterdam. A number of the books she has illustrated have been translated into English by Gecko Press.

Select English titles
2015 – Detective Gordon: The First Case, 96pp., (Gecko Press) 
2016 – Detective Gordon: A Complicated Case, 108pp., (Gecko Press) 
2017 – Detective Gordon: A Case in Any Case, 108pp., (Gecko Press) 
2018 – Detective Gordon: A Case for Buffy, 112pp., (Gecko Press)

References

Living people
Dutch illustrators
Artists from Amsterdam
1950 births